William Yan Thorley (born 3 September 2002) is a Hong Kong marathon swimmer.

He competed in the 2020 Summer Olympics and finished 22nd in the men's 10 kilometer race.

References

2002 births
Living people
Hong Kong male long-distance swimmers
Olympic swimmers of Hong Kong
Swimmers at the 2020 Summer Olympics